Gradsteinia torrenticola is a species of moss in the family Amblystegiaceae. It is endemic to Spain. Its natural habitat is rivers.

References

Hypnales
Endemic flora of the Canary Islands
Matorral shrubland
Vulnerable plants
Taxonomy articles created by Polbot